Olivier Mantei (born 24 February 1965, in Nantes) is a contemporary French director of theatre and opera stages. Since 2015, he has been director of the Opéra-Comique in Paris.

Honours 
Mantei was made an officier of the National Order of Merit in November 2013 and Officier of the Ordre des Arts et des Lettres in July 2016.

Publications 
 Public / Privé: Nouvelles acceptions culturelles, Riveneuve, Paris 2014 .

References

External links 
 Biography of Olivier Mantei (Opéra-Comique)
 Olivier Mantei (Heuresmusicalesdelessay)
 Olivier Mantei prend la tête de l'Opéra Comique (Le Monde, 29 April 2014)
 Olivier Mantei (France Musique)
 Olivier Mantei double la mise (Le Monde, 8 September 2014)
 Olivier Mantei connaît la musique à l'Opéra-Comique (Les Échos, 14 May 2014)
 Olivier Mantei remplace Jérôme Deschamps à la tête de l'Opéra comique (France Info, 6 December 2014)

1965 births
Living people
People from Nantes
Opera managers
French theatre directors
Knights of the Ordre national du Mérite
Officiers of the Ordre des Arts et des Lettres